Animesh Debbarma, Deputy CEM of TTADC, is the leader of the Tipra Motha, headed by Maharaja Pradyot Kishore Manikya and a former Member of the Legislative Assembly from the state of Tripura, India.  Debbarma was previously a member of the Indigenous Nationalist Party of Twipra.

He proposed a motion for the electricity problem in Tripura. He has raised the demand for autonomous state for the Borok people of Tripura presently living in the district council area. He is known as Animesh Babu and Father of NCT.  Debbarma graduated with B.Tech in Computer Science and engineering from NERIST, Arunachal Pradesh. He has worked as an engineer in Indian Oil, Mumbai for many years and CSIRO, Nagpur as a scientist for few years. He left his lucrative corporate job to dedicate his life for the people of Tripura.

References

Living people
Tripura politicians
Tripuri people
Tripura MLAs 2003–2008
Indigenous Nationalist Party of Twipra politicians
National Conference of Tripura politicians
Year of birth missing (living people)